Magnus is a 2016 documentary film by  about the early life of Norwegian chess prodigy Magnus Carlsen, him becoming a Grandmaster at age 13 and winning the FIDE World Chess Championship in 2013. The film premiered at Tribeca Film Festival in 2016, and was sold to 64 countries.

Premiere

Magnus premiered at Tribeca Film Festival in 2016. and became the first Norwegian feature documentary to have its world premiere at the festival. Magnus Carlsen did not attend to the premiere of the film, but his family was present. The film became the fastest sold out film at the festival that year, and the artistic director at Tribeca Film Festival Frederic Boyer said the film was one of his favorites that year.

Critical reception

Magnus received mostly positive reviews from film critics. It holds a 81% approval rating on review aggregator website Rotten Tomatoes, based on 21 reviews, with a weighted average of 6.2/10. BBC put the film on its top 10 list, November 2016, as the only documentary on the list, calling the film: "[...) an intimate look Carlsen’s extraordinary life through archive footage, home movies and interviews.". Later BBC published a behind the scenes featurette about the film, showing a clip of Magnus Carlsen playing blindfolded chess against 10 lawyers at Harvard University, beating them all.

Notable awards

Global Future Prize – Oulu International Children’s and Youth Film Festival.
The Ray of Sunshine – The NorwegianFilm Festival.
Audience Award – Docville

References

External links

Magnus on Rotten Tomatoes
BBC Featurette

Films about chess
2016 documentary films
2010s English-language films
Magnus Carlsen